Blace may refer to:

Bosnia and Herzegovina
 Blace, Konjic, a village
 Blace, Prozor, a village
 Blace (Višegrad), a village

Croatia
 Blace, Croatia, a village near Opuzen

France
 Blacé, a commune of the Rhône department

Kosovo
 Bllacë, a village near Suva Reka

North Macedonia
 Blace, Čučer-Sandevo, a village
 Blace, Brvenica, a village

Serbia
 Blace, Serbia, a town and municipality in the Toplica district